Go Off! is the second and final studio album by heavy metal band Cacophony, released in 1988 through Shrapnel Records. About two years after the album's release, guitarist Jason Becker was diagnosed with ALS, rendering him paralyzed and completely unable to play to this day. Also two years later, guitarist Marty Friedman joined the band Megadeth. The album was re-released on CD in 1991.

Critical reception

In a contemporary review, Wolfgang Schäfer of Rock Hard was not overly impressed by the album but remarked how Friedman and Becker refrained "from superfluous solo escapades", making the music more accessible and fueling the suspicion that Mike Varney wanted "to repeat the success of the dissolved Racer X with this band."

Andy Hinds at AllMusic found Go Off! an improvement on their 1987 debut album Speed Metal Symphony and compared the "slightly more song-oriented approach" to contemporaries Racer X. He praised Friedman and Becker's technical craft as "a very interesting listen at times" and that "there are even some beautiful moments, like the outro of the title track", while also noting an element of restraint in their playing compared to Speed Metal Symphony. However, much criticism was directed at singer Peter Marrino, with Hinds lambasting his vocals as "annoying" and the lyrics "ridiculous".

Martin Popoff reviewed positively the album and considered it "too crazy, professional and intense for its day", becoming "a cult classic" and "a mid-years progressive metal cornerstone." He was also critical of Marrino's vocals, but praised Deen Castronovo's performance as "possibly his chopsiest of a long career."

Track listing

Personnel
Cacophony
Peter Marrino – vocals
Marty Friedman – guitar, producer
Jason Becker – guitar, producer
Jimmy O'Shea – bass
Kenny Stavropoulos - drums (appears on the cover but does not play on the album)
Deen Castronovo – drums

Production
Steve Fontano – producer, engineer
Joe Marquez, Scott Tatter, Michael Rosen – engineers
Dino Alden, Marc Reyburn – assistant engineers
George Horn – mastering at Fantasy Studios, Berkeley, California
Mike Varney – executive producer

References

External links
Story Behind The Song - Cacophony's Go Off! at martyfriedman.com
In Review: Cacophony "Go Off!" at Guitar Nine Records

Cacophony (band) albums
Jason Becker albums
Marty Friedman albums
1988 albums
Shrapnel Records albums
Albums produced by Mike Varney